Hainesville is an unincorporated community on U.S. Route 11 in Berkeley County, West Virginia, United States.

See also 

Battle of Hoke's Run

Unincorporated communities in Berkeley County, West Virginia
Unincorporated communities in West Virginia